Greenwood Township is a township in Crawford County, Pennsylvania, United States. The population was 1,431 at the 2020 census, down from 1,454 at the 2010 census.

Geography
Greenwood Township is in southern Crawford County, bordered to the south by Mercer County. It is bordered to the north by the Conneaut Outlet, a stream with associated wetlands flowing from Conneaut Lake towards French Creek, a tributary of the Allegheny River. The township contains the unincorporated communities of Geneva in the north and Custards in the northeast.

Interstate 79 crosses the eastern side of the township, with access from Exit 141 (Pennsylvania Route 285) near Custards. U.S. Route 19, the Perry Highway, parallels I-79 to the west.

Natural features
Geologic Province: Northwestern Glaciated Plateau
Lowest Elevation:  Conneaut Outlet where it flows out of the township.
Highest Elevation:  at a high point southeast of Wecas Corners, Pennsylvania.
Major Rivers/Streams and Watersheds: Sandy Creek (south end of township) and Conneaut Outlet (forms northern border)
Minor Rivers/Streams and Watersheds:
 Conneaut Outlet tributaries: Rock Creek, Williams Run, and McMichael Run
 Sandy Creek tributaries: unnamed tributaries
Biological Diversity Areas: Conneaut Marsh Complex-Central BDA, Conneaut Marsh Complex-North BDA, Conneaut Marsh Complex-South BDA, Sandy Creek Wetlands BDA 
Landscape Conservation Areas: Conneaut-Geneva Marsh LCA

Demographics

As of the census of 2000, there were 1,487 people, 560 households, and 427 families residing in the township.  The population density was 41.1 people per square mile (15.9/km).  There were 609 housing units at an average density of 16.8/sq mi (6.5/km).  The racial makeup of the township was 99.26% White, 0.20% African American, 0.20% Asian, 0.07% Pacific Islander, 0.07% from other races, and 0.20% from two or more races. Hispanic or Latino of any race were 0.20% of the population.

There were 560 households, out of which 32.9% had children under the age of 18 living with them, 62.5% were married couples living together, 8.9% had a female householder with no husband present, and 23.8% were non-families. 18.8% of all households were made up of individuals, and 6.8% had someone living alone who was 65 years of age or older.  The average household size was 2.66 and the average family size was 3.02.

In the township the population was spread out, with 26.5% under the age of 18, 7.1% from 18 to 24, 28.9% from 25 to 44, 26.4% from 45 to 64, and 11.1% who were 65 years of age or older.  The median age was 37 years. For every 100 females, there were 102.9 males.  For every 100 females age 18 and over, there were 99.1 males.

The median income for a household in the township was $35,250, and the median income for a family was $38,977. Males had a median income of $31,154 versus $19,063 for females. The per capita income for the township was $14,584.  About 8.3% of families and 11.8% of the population were below the poverty line, including 19.1% of those under age 18 and 8.1% of those age 65 or over.

References

External links 
 Greenwood Township (Crawford County, PA) Comprehensive Plan

Townships in Crawford County, Pennsylvania
Townships in Pennsylvania